Todor Krastev (1 June 1945 – 9 May 2000) was a Bulgarian footballer. He was born in Stara Zagora. He competed at the 1968 Summer Olympics in Mexico City, where he won a silver medal with the Bulgarian team.

References

External links

1945 births
2000 deaths
Bulgarian footballers
Bulgaria international footballers
PFC Beroe Stara Zagora players
OFC Sliven 2000 players
First Professional Football League (Bulgaria) players
Olympic footballers of Bulgaria
Footballers at the 1968 Summer Olympics
Olympic silver medalists for Bulgaria
Olympic medalists in football
Sportspeople from Stara Zagora
Medalists at the 1968 Summer Olympics
Association football goalkeepers